Paolo Signorelli (10 March 1939 – 3 May 2018) was an Italian professional footballer who played for Trevigliese, Pro Patria and Atalanta, as a midfielder.

References

1939 births
2018 deaths
Italian footballers
Aurora Pro Patria 1919 players
Atalanta B.C. players
Serie B players
Serie A players
Association football midfielders
People from Treviglio
Sportspeople from the Province of Bergamo
Footballers from Lombardy